HMS Diana was a 38-gun Artois-class fifth rate frigate of the Royal Navy. She was launched in 1794.

Because Diana served in the Royal Navy's Egyptian campaign between 8 March 1801 and 2 September, her officers and crew qualified for the clasp "Egypt" to the Naval General Service Medal that the Admiralty authorized in 1850 to all surviving claimants.

(Boats from Diana went in and set fire to the beached Eliza despite heavy fire from shore batteries and three nearby armed brigs; the British suffered no casualties.)

In January or February 1812 the French captured , Gillespie, master. Diana recaptured Patent on 4 February. Patent arrived at Plymouth on 6 February.

Fate
On 7 March 1815 Diana was sold to the Dutch navy for £36,796. On 27 August 1816 she was one of six Dutch frigates that participated in the bombardment of Algiers. Diana was destroyed in a fire on 16 January 1839 while in dry-dock at Willemsoord, Den Helder.

Notes, citations, and references
Notes

Sources

References
 
 
 HMS Diana at Modelships.de – ship model with a short description.
 HMS Diana at Jotika Ltd. – another model with additional info.

 

Frigates of the Royal Navy
Frigates of the Royal Netherlands Navy
1794 ships
Ships built on the River Thames
Maritime incidents in January 1839
Artois-class frigates